Gumpert is a surname and may refer to:
 Ben Gumpert (born 1963), English barrister
 Dave Gumpert (born 1958), American baseball player
 Friedrich Gumpert (1841–1906), German horn player and teacher
 Martin Gumpert (1897–1955), Jewish German-born American physician and writer
 Randy Gumpert (1918–2008), American professional baseball pitcher, manager, scout and coach.
 Roland Gumpert (born 1944), German engineer
 Thomas Gumpert (1952—2021), German actor

Gumpert may also refer to:
 Gumpert Sportwagenmanufaktur, previous name of sports car manufacturer Apollo Automobil